Griff Allen is an American motorsports broadcaster, engineer, and actor/performer. Allen is known for his appearances on ESPN2 as host, reporter and analyst for ESPN SpeedWorld, the Outdoor Channel, Spike TV, Speed Channel, and other programming.

Allen performs live analysis and commentary for AMA Superbike, ASRA, CCS, monster truck events, motocross, arenacross, drifting, rock crawling, car shows, major industry trade shows and auto shows.

Allen served as the national spokesperson for the Toyo TiresTake it to the Track program - which discourages illegal street racing. He has appeared frequently on local TV stations nationwide addressing issues of transportation-related public safety.

Career

Engineering 
Allen worked in steel production, fluid systems component manufacturing, actuator development and investment casting. On 20 October 1998, he was awarded patent number 5,822,989 for his work in developing a fuel-saving clutch mechanism used in the heavy trucking industry along with co-inventors Michael L. Sturdevant and Edward T. Schneider. Allen holds a bachelor's degree in mechanical engineering.

Acting
Allen appeared as Captain Georg von Trapp in The Sound of Music and William Harrison Brent in the Ohio premier of Perfect Crime at Chagrin Valley Little Theatre. He appeared as Mark Ferris in London Suite and Mike Connor in High Society with The Gates Mills Players - where he also directed the Pulitzer Prize for Drama nominated play Love Letters by A. R. Gurney. He also appeared as Brett - a police officer in the 2001 HBO film Proximity, and as a Desk Sergeant in the 2004 Christopher K. Young film Sugar. Allen appeared as a CDC Official in Diagnosis: Unknown on the Discovery Health Channel. He has appeared in numerous radio and television commercials - most notably for Summit Racing Equipment.

Motorsports broadcasting

Allen was introduced to TV broadcasting and production through his public-access television show Crossviews, and was invited to host Speedvision’s Competition Offshore - which covered offshore powerboat racing sanctioned by the American Power Boat Association. Allen was also briefly a sports producer at Cleveland's Fox 8 under Casey Coleman.

Allen has co-hosted or served as production designer for XDL events, and co-hosts ESPN2's Bidding Wars. In 2008, Allen and Genevieve Chappell co-host along with Stephen Cox as the host.

Allen hosted the 2008 AMA Sports Banquet at the Barber Vintage Motorsports Museum. He emceed the 2009 and 2010 AMA Vintage Motorcycle Days taking place at Mid-Ohio Sports Car Course in Lexington, Ohio. He co-hosted the 2010 AMA Racing Championship Banquet presented by World of Powersports at the Red Rock Casino Resort Spa in Las Vegas, Nevada with Laurette Nicoll.

References

External links
 
 www.playinthestreet.com- official website
 American Motorcyclist Association (AMA)  - official website

Living people
Motorsport announcers
Actors from Shaker Heights, Ohio
American inventors
Year of birth missing (living people)